The Birmingham to Worcester via Kidderminster line is a railway line which runs from Birmingham Snow Hill to Worcester via Stourbridge and Kidderminster in the West Midlands, England. It is one of the Snow Hill Lines, with trains operated by West Midlands Trains and Chiltern Railways using a variety of rolling stock including  and  diesel units. It is a future aspiration of Network Rail to electrify the entire line, as well as the Chiltern Main Line to London Marylebone.

The line is one of two railway routes between Birmingham and Worcester, the other route runs via Bromsgrove.

History
The line between Worcester and Stourbridge Junction was opened as part of the Oxford, Worcester and Wolverhampton Railway (OWWR), in 1852. 
Opening in 1867, the line between Stourbridge Junction and Smethwick was built by an independent company; the Stourbridge Railway; at Smethwick this line joined the Stour Valley Line at Galton Junction.  
A short link was opened at the same time by the Great Western Railway (GWR) which connected the Stourbridge Railway at Smethwick to the Birmingham Snow Hill to Wolverhampton Line at Handsworth, allowing trains to run into Snow Hill station. By 1870, the OWWR and Stourbridge Railway had been absorbed by the GWR, later passing to British Railways in 1948.

In the late 1960s, services to Snow Hill were run down. In 1967 most services on the line were diverted to Birmingham New Street. A single line as far as Handsworth was kept open for freight traffic (cement & scrap metals).

Jewellery Line project

Snow Hill station was reopened to services from the south in October 1987. In 1993, as part of the project to restore services through Snow Hill, work began on reopening the 4 miles (6 km) of line between Smethwick and Snow Hill as the "Jewellery Line"; the line was reopened on 24 September 1995.

Three new stations were opened on the restored route: , The Hawthorns and Jewellery Quarter. Smethwick Galton Bridge station was built as a two-level interchange with trains on the Birmingham New Street-Wolverhampton Line, and it replaced the nearby  station which closed soon after.

The reopening cost £28.5 million in 1995 prices, with the majority of the funding coming from Centro. It allowed cross-city rail services to operate through Snow Hill, and freed up much needed capacity at New Street station. According to Centro, it created "a third cross city line linking the lines to Worcester and Hereford with those to Stratford-upon-Avon and Leamington Spa".

Services

Places served
The line serves the following places:

Birmingham Snow Hill – Colmore Row, City Centre and a short walk to New Street and a direct rail link to Moor Street
Jewellery Quarter – Hockley, Birmingham
The Hawthorns – Halfords Lane, Smethwick for the West Bromwich Albion Football Club & Midland Metro
Galton Bridge – Higher Level Station. Local services to Birmingham New Street
Langley Green – Langley Green, Oldbury
Rowley Regis – Blackheath Town Centre and Park & Ride
Old Hill
Cradley Heath – bus link to the Merry Hill Shopping Centre
Lye
Stourbridge – Junction station for the Town Branch
Hagley
Blakedown
Kidderminster – for Severn Valley Steam Railway
Hartlebury – Limited Service
Droitwich Spa
Worcester – Foregate Street/Shrub Hill

Service information

Passenger services are provided by West Midlands Trains between Birmingham and Worcester and beyond, and by Chiltern Railways between Birmingham and Kidderminster only.

The local service provided by West Midland Trains comprises:

Six trains per hour from Birmingham Snow Hill to Stourbridge Junction;
 of which four continue to Kidderminster
 of which two continue to Worcester

London Midland trains heading to Stratford-upon-Avon call at all stations along the route between Stourbridge Junction and Birmingham Snow Hill, whereas trains to Dorridge or Whitlocks End operate a semi- fast service. A triangular junction at Worcester allows a variety of service patterns (see map). Some trains terminate at Shrub Hill, whereas some reverse there before going to Foregate Street. Other trains take the direct curve to Foregate Street avoiding Shrub Hill.

Chiltern Railways run services to London Marylebone in the morning rush hour, which start from Kidderminster rather than Snow Hill, and reverse journeys during the evening.

Before the reopening of Snow Hill, trains along this route ran into Birmingham New Street, where they terminated. Even after the Snow Hill reopening a lower level of service to New Street was maintained, but this link was axed altogether at the May 2004 timetable change, to much local consternation. Passengers for New Street must now either walk between Moor Street and New Street stations, use the Midland Metro between Snow Hill and New Street, or change at Smethwick Galton Bridge. This did however add much needed extra capacity to the Stour Valley Line into Birmingham New Street and free up platform space there. This service took the connection between Galton and Smethwick Junctions near Smethwick West. Services were once hourly from Worcester to Birmingham New Street via Stourbridge.

Two CrossCountry services are timetabled to use the line each day — one service from Birmingham New Street (via Smethwick Junction and Galton Junction) in the early morning and a pair of reverse services in the evening. None of these call at any of the stations along the line and are scheduled to ensure drivers retain knowledge of the route. During congestion or mainly during engineering works, the line sees much more frequent service as a diversionary route. The line from Worcester Shrub Hill continues to Cheltenham Spa railway station, which is the next calling point for most CrossCountry services, and thus offers a convenient alternative when the Lickey Incline is closed.

Several charter trains can often be seen on the line due to the existence of the Severn Valley Railway which has a mainline connection at Kidderminster.

See also
 Birmingham to Worcester via Bromsgrove Line
 Snow Hill Lines
 Stourbridge Town Branch Line

References

Bibliography

External links

Stourbridge Line User Group — guide to stations

Railway lines in the West Midlands (region)
Rail transport in Worcestershire
Rail transport in the West Midlands (county)
Transport in Worcester, England